Xyroptila marmarias is a moth of the family Pterophoridae. It is found on the Atherton Tableland in Queensland, Australia, and it is also known from New Guinea.

The bright colours of the adult suggest it is a day active species.

Its biology is unknown, but the larvae of various related species feed on flowers.

References

External links
Australian Faunal Directory
A Guide to Australian Moths
Papua Insects

Moths of Australia
marmarias
Moths of New Guinea
Moths described in 1908